WYPH may refer to:

 WYPH-LP, a defunct radio station (102.5 FM) formerly licensed to serve Manchester, Connecticut, United States
 West Yorkshire Playhouse, former name of a theatre in Leeds, England